Viktor Fedorovych Bilash (1893 – 24 January 1938) was the Chief of Staff of the Revolutionary Insurgent Army of Ukraine (RIAU) under Nestor Makhno. A gifted military commander, Bilash himself planned many of the Insurgent Army's operations, later becoming its commander in chief after  Makhno's flight into exile.

His son, Oleksandr, a World War II veteran, was able to obtain the manuscript of his father's work, with other previously unknown documents in 1993. He subsequently published it together as a book called “The Roads of Nestor Makhno”.

Biography
Viktor Bilash was born in the small Pryazovian town of Novospasivka, where he worked as a train driver during his youth. During the early months of the Ukrainian War of Independence, the Austro-Hungarian Army shot Viktor's father, grandfather and cousin, and even set his house on fire, in reprisal for Bilash having joined the partisan movement against the Central Powers.

Rise to command
In December 1918, Bilash first arrived in the insurgent capital of Huliaipole, where he was immediately met with "drunk machine-gunners riding in a tachanka along the main street". During an emergency insurgent conference at Huliaipole in January 1919, Bilash was given the task of summoning a congress for delegates from the front lines, in order to bring the various units under a single military command, with a more comprehensive organizational structure. He went searching for the various disparate detachments on the southern front, visiting units stationed at Polohy, Orikhiv and Zherebets. On 3 January, over 40 delegates met for the congress at Polohy, where they elected a general staff and picked Bilash himself to head it as chief of staff. 

The following day, Bilash set about reorganizing the front. He formed the 6,200 insurgents into 5 regiments, each of which was composed of 3 battalions, which were in turn composed of 3 companies, which were in turn composed of three platoons. Each unit elected their own commanders and each regiment appointed its own general staff, with these regimental staffs being headquartered respectively at Basan, Polohy, Orikhiv, Tsarekostyantynivka and Zherebets. He then transferred 2,500 of the insurgents to Tsarekostyantynivka and selected Simeon Pravda as his deputy, although he would not end up taking this post. Bilash subsequently instructed all units to prepare for an offensive against South Russia on 9 January, even though the Russian forces under Vladimir May-Mayevsky outnumbered the poorly-equipped insurgents. By 20 January, a series of desertions caused the insurgent ranks under Bilash to swell to 15,000 infantry, 1,000 cavalry and 40 machine guns, which were posted throughout a 150-mile long front line.

Following a White offensive against the insurgent positions, a peasant congress at Dibrivka elected a delegation to negotiate a ceasefire between the various sides and to secure the release of draftees from their military service. But when the delegation met with Bilash at Pokrovske, he informed them that he had already dispatched Oleksiy Chubenko to negotiate an alliance with the Red Army, a decision he had made without informing the civilian congress. On 28 January, Chubenko reported back from his meeting with Pavel Dybenko, where he agreed to the integration of the Insurgent Army into the 1st Zadneprovsk Ukrainian Soviet Division, while ensuring that the insurgents would retain their democratic structure. Viktor Bilash was subsequently dispatched as part of the insurgent delegation to the Ukrainian Soviet capital of Kharkiv, where he signed the written agreement in early February. While in the city, Bilash also contacted the Nabat and secured from them a shipment of literature to the insurgents, eventually resulting in the establishment of a Nabat group in Huliaipole. Upon Bilash's return to Huliaipole, he reported on the revolutionary activity taking place in the town, where free soviets and agricultural communes had been established. 

By April 1919, tensions between the insurgents and their Bolshevik commanders had reached a breaking point, as Dybenko attempted to ban the insurgents' Third Regional Congress. Shortly before Lev Kamenev arrived in Huliaipole on a state visit in May 1919, Nestor Makhno cautioned Bilash to be "ready for anything", as he was worried the Bolsheviks may pull some "dirty tricks". By June 1919, the alliance was definitively broken and the Makhnovists withdrew from the Red Army.

Consolidation of the Insurgent Army
During the subsequent Makhnovist retreat to right-bank Ukraine, Bilash reported that they had turned away all units that wanted to join them, as Makhno was worried about weakening the Soviet front against the White movement. After the Makhnovists joined together with the green army of Nykyfor Hryhoriv in Kherson, the insurgent forces were thoroughly consolidated. Viktor Bilash reported that, at this time, the insurgent army numbered "40,000 infantry, 10,000 cavalry, 1,000 machine guns and 20 artillery pieces" with 13,000 additional non-combatants organizing a supply chain, which consisted of "8,000 britzkas and tachanki for the infantry, another 2,000 carriages for the staff, communications and medical, 1,000 carriages with machine guns, 1,000 with artillery supplies and 500 carrying food..." On 1 September, a new Military Revolutionary Council (VRS) was elected and Bilash took over the newly established general staff, which was responsible for organizing and managing the insurgent army.

After fight a series of skirmishes with the Volunteer Army, the insurgent army was forced into a retreat, pushing them as far back as Uman. Bilash reported that around 10,000 White troops had been killed during the battle of Peregonovka, while 5,000 more were taken as prisoners of war afterwards and their captured horses were redistributed to the local peasantry.

During the insurgent army's march east, Bilash reported that it covered 373 kilometres within a week, at a rate of 53 kilometres per day. The insurgents rapidly captured numerous cities throughout southern Ukraine, including Kryvyi Rih, Nikopol and Oleksandrivsk, where Bilash was elected to the VRS by a Regional Congress. Bilash himself paused in several places along the way, in order to raise autonomous partisan units to fight the White movement, causing the peasant insurrection to spread "like wildfire". He estimated that, around this time, the Insurgent Army's ranks numbered 250,000 people. 

In the occupied territory, Bilash reported that the insurgents carried out a campaign of "Black Terror" against members of the White movement. In December 1919, an argument broke out between the civilian VRS and the insurgent command over the army's extrajudicial execution of Bolsheviks that had participated in the Polonsky conspiracy. The VRS refused to accept Nestor Makhno's account of events and established an investigation commission, consisting of Viktor Bilash, Volin and Mikhail Uralov. But as Bilash and Uralov supported Makhno from the beginning of the investigation, Volin too was brought over to Makhno's side and made an agreement with the insurgent commander, ensuring the VRS maintained its authority over civilian affairs and the insurgent command over military affairs.

Guerrilla warfare
During the summer of 1920, the insurgents carried out a campaign of guerrilla warfare against the Russian Army. At this period of time, Bilash reported that approximately 45% of the insurgent forces consisted of Red Army deserters. He also reported that some insurgents formed a temporary truce with the Ukrainian People's Army during this period, handing over surplus weapons to them in the regions of Chernihiv, Kherson, Kyiv and Poltava.

When an alliance with the Red Army was proposed at a meeting of the insurgent command on 23 June 1920, Bilash proposed that the insurgents continue to fight against them, in spite of any ongoing peace talks, and agreed with Oleksiy Marchenko that they should avoid any alliance with the Bolsheviks. But by the time that the proposed alliance was brought up again in August 1920, Bilash was among those that supported the proposal. To break the deadlock within the command staff, they called an insurgent general assembly, which voted in favor of the alliance after a lengthy debate. On 6 October 1920, the agreement was signed in Starobilsk by Viktor Bilash, Semen Karetnyk and Dmitry Popov. But even following the formation of an alliance between the Bolsheviks and the Makhnovists, the insurgents still found themselves to be ill-equipped. On 2 November, Bilash telegramed Mikhail Frunze asking for winter clothing and munitions.

Immediately after the Government of South Russia was ousted from Crimea in November 1920, the Red Army attacked the Makhnovshchina, forcing them back into partisan warfare as part of a generalized anti-Bolshevik uprising. In these final months, Makhno kept Bilash by his side and trained him in his insurgent strategy, before dispatching him elsewhere to carry out guerrilla warfare against the Red Army. By July 1921, it had become clear that the insurgents were facing an imminent defeat by the Red Army, which was pursuing a scorched earth strategy against the Makhnovshchina. About 1,000 of the remaining insurgents held an open meeting, during which a general retreat from Ukraine was discussed. Bilash expressed a desire to move their operations to Anatolia, where the Turkish National Movement's war of independence against the Entente was ongoing, but nothing came of this proposal.

Final years
In August 1921, Makhno decided to leave the country in order to have his wounds treated, leaving the insurgent core under the command of Viktor Bilash. By the autumn, Bilash's detachment was surrounded in a surprise attack by the Red Army at Znamianka and largely wiped out. Some of the survivors managed to flee to Romania or Poland, while a wounded Bilash was himself captured by the Cheka and moved to a prison in Kharkiv, where he wrote his memoirs about the Makhnovshchina. 

With the Makhnovshchina finally liquidated, the Ukrainian Soviet government pressed charges against the captured insurgents. In 1923, Bilash and other captured members of the insurgent staff were tried and sentenced to death by the Cheka. Bilash's sentence was commuted and instead he was banished to Krasnodar, where he took up work as a mechanic in a Hunters' Union workshop. But in December 1937, during the height of the Great Purge, he was arrested by the NKVD and sentenced to execution by firing squad. On 29 April 1976, Bilash was rehabilitated due to "insufficient evidence" against him.

Following the dissolution of the Soviet Union and the reinstitution of freedom of the press in Ukraine, a number of works about the Makhnovshchina were published for the first time. In 1993, Viktor Bilash's son Oleksandr published his memoirs Dorogi Nestora Makhno, based on the manuscripts that Viktor had written while imprisoned by the Cheka during the 1920s. It has since become a key primary source for the historiography of the Makhnovshchina.

Works

References

Bibliography

External links

1893 births
1938 deaths
20th-century Ukrainian writers
Anarchist partisans
Anarcho-communists
Deaths by firearm in Ukraine
Great Purge victims from Ukraine
Military chiefs of staff
People executed by the Soviet Union by firing squad
People from Zaporizhzhia Oblast
People from Mariupolsky Uyezd
Soviet anarchists
Soviet military personnel of the Russian Civil War
Soviet rehabilitations
Ukrainian anarchists
Ukrainian male writers
Ukrainian military leaders
Ukrainian revolutionaries
Ukrainian writers in Russian
Executed anarchists